is a Japanese manga written and illustrated by Suehiro Maruo and based on a 1926 novella of the same name  by Edogawa Ranpo. The manga adaptation was published in English by Last Gasp on July 1, 2013.

Plot
Hitomi Hirosuke, a struggling novelist, writes a story titled "The Tale of RA" about a protagonist who suddenly gains wealth and constructs a paradise. His editor informs him that his wealthy boarding school friend, Genzaburo Komoda, has died. Hitomi forms a plan to impersonate the dead Genzaburo, who looks exactly like him, to gain his fortune. He fakes his suicide and exhumes Genzaburo's corpse, hiding it and pulling out his own tooth to match Genzaburo's false one. When Hitomi is discovered in Genzaburo's hometown, a doctor attributes his resurrection to catalepsy and Hitomi successfully passes for Genzaburo. Hitomi convinces his family advisor, Tsunoda, of his plan to build an amusement park on the island of Nakanoshima, relocating the fishermen living there. He finances the construction by selling the Komoda family treasures, and appeases his business associate by giving him their kiln. Genzaburo's widow, Chiyoko, learns about his deception after he has sex with her.

Near the completion of the amusement park, Hitomi takes Chiyoko to the island on a tour. He shows her extravagant manmade landscapes dotted with statues and frolicking attractive people, an aquarium tunnel, and portions of the island made to look larger optically like a panorama. Chiyoko is overwhelmed, fainting, and Hitomi chokes her to death. Later, Hitomi is visited by a detective named Kogoro Kitami who had read "The Tale of RA" and discovered Hitomi's act. Hitomi commits suicide by launching himself in a firework.

History
Japanese mystery and suspense author Edogawa Ranpo originally serialized his novella The Strange Tale of Panorama Island in the October 1926 issue of Shinseinen.

Reception
The manga won the New Artist Prize at the 13th Tezuka Osamu Cultural Prize in 2009 and was nominated in 2014 for an Eisner Award for Best Adaptation from Another Medium.

References

External links

2008 manga
Adaptations of works by Edogawa Rampo
Comics based on fiction
Enterbrain manga
Fantasy anime and manga
Manga based on novels
One-shot manga
Seinen manga
Suehiro Maruo
Winner of Tezuka Osamu Cultural Prize (New Artist Prize)